Olancha Peak is a mountain in the Sierra Nevada of California. It takes its name from the nearby town of Olancha.

The mountain is also known as "Indianhead" and "the Sleeping Maiden", as some think that parts of the ridgeline of the southern slope of the mountain, when viewed from certain angles, resembles either the face of a man or the figure of a woman lying on her back.

The peak is one of the highest in the Sierra Nevada south of Mount Whitney. It is the southernmost peak that is significantly above treeline on the Sierra Nevada escarpment. Due to the high elevation, most of the precipitation the mountain receives consists of snow.

References

External links 
 
 

Mountains of the Sierra Nevada (United States)
Mountains of Inyo County, California
Mountains of Tulare County, California
Inyo National Forest
Mountains of Northern California
North American 3000 m summits